Eberhard Fischer (born 15 October 1941) is a German art historian, ethnologist and author based in Switzerland. He is a former Director and the incumbent President of Rietberg Society, Switzerland. Fischer was honored by the Government of India, in 2012, with the fourth highest Indian civilian award of Padma Shri.

Biography
Eberhard Fischer was born in Berlin, Germany on 15 October 1941. He is an ethnologist and art historian who is known to have researched on the heritages of India and other African and Asian places. He is a former Director of Rietberg Society and serves as its president. He is also the Secretary General of the Swiss-Liechtenstein Foundation for Archaeological Research Abroad (SLSA). Fischer has authored several books on art and ethnic heritage and has contributed to the publication of many others. He has also produced Nainsukh, a 90 mins feature film in Dogri language with English subtitles, in 2010, with filmmaker Amit Dutta . The Government of India awarded him the civilian honor of Padma Shri in 2012. After receiving the award on 4 April 2012, Fischer donated his collection of over 40 books to Jawaharlal Nehru University, Delhi.

Awards
 2012: Received the fourth highest Indian civilian award of Padma Shri.

See also

 Haku Shah

 Rietberg Museum

References

Further reading
 
 
 
 
 
 Treasures from the Rietberg Museum (1980)

External links
 
 
 * 

1941 births
Living people
Recipients of the Padma Shri in literature & education
Swiss art historians
German art historians
Museologists
Historians of Indian art